Streptomyces niger is a bacterium species from the genus of Streptomyces. Streptomyces niger produces streptomycin.

See also 
 List of Streptomyces species

References

Further reading

External links
Type strain of Streptomyces niger at BacDive – the Bacterial Diversity Metadatabase

niger
Bacteria described in 1986